"My Favorite Things" is a song from the 1959 Rodgers and Hammerstein musical The Sound of Music.

In the original Broadway production, this song was introduced by Mary Martin playing Maria and Patricia Neway playing Mother Abbess. Julie Andrews, who played Maria in the 1965 film version of the musical, had previously sung it on the 1961 Christmas special for The Garry Moore Show.

In 2004 the movie version of the song finished at No. 64 on AFI's 100 Years...100 Songs survey of top tunes in American cinema.

Other notable versions 
John Coltrane played a fourteen-minute version in E minor as the title track of an album recorded in October 1960 and released in March 1961. It became a jazz classic and a signature song for Coltrane in concert, also appearing on Newport '63 in 1963.

In 1964, Jack Jones became the first of many artists to include the song on a Christmas album.

Herb Alpert and the Tijuana Brass released a version in 1969 as a single from their 1968 album, Christmas Album. It reached No. 45 on the Billboard 100. Lorrie Morgan's version appeared in 1994 and again in 1999 at No. 64 and No. 69, respectively, on the Hot Country Songs chart after she recorded it for her 1993 album, Merry Christmas from London.

In 2019, Ariana Grande based her song "7 Rings" on the melody of "My Favorite Things". The song topped the charts in fifteen countries.

Charts

The Supremes version

Glee Cast version

References

External links 

 Notes, lyrics, mp3s, different versions compared
 "My Favorite Things at 60," public radio documentary on the 60th anniversary of John Coltrane's rendition of "My Favorite Things."

1959 songs
List songs
American Christmas songs
Jazz compositions in E minor
Songs from The Sound of Music
Mary Martin songs
Julie Andrews songs
Songs with lyrics by Oscar Hammerstein II
Songs with music by Richard Rodgers